is a Japanese footballer who plays for Avispa Fukuoka as a right winger.

Career statistics

Club
Last updated in the end of 2018 season

1 Includes Emperor's Cup and Copa del Rey.
2Includes J.League Cup.
3Includes AFC Champions League.

Honours

Club
  FC Tokyo
J.League Division 2 (1) : 2011
Emperor's Cup (1) : 2011
J.League Cup (1) : 2009
Suruga Bank Championship (1) : 2010

See also
 List of Japanese footballers playing in Europe

References

External links

FC Tokyo official profile 

1990 births
Living people
Association football people from Tokyo
Japanese footballers
J1 League players
J2 League players
J3 League players
Segunda División players
FC Tokyo players
FC Tokyo U-23 players
CE Sabadell FC footballers
Avispa Fukuoka players
Japanese expatriate footballers
Japanese expatriate sportspeople in Spain
Expatriate footballers in Spain
Association football midfielders